The Fountain Theatre is a theatre in Los Angeles. Along with its programming of live theatre, it's also the foremost producer of flamenco on the West Coast.

History

The Fountain Theatre was founded in Los Angeles in 1990 by co-artistic directors Deborah Lawlor (wife of Robert Lawlor) and Stephen Sachs. Simon Levy, producing director and dramaturge, joined in 1993 as a resident director, producer, and playwright.

The Fountain Theatre's activities include a year-round season of fully produced new and established plays. It has mounted 35 world premieres and also 31 US, West-Coast, Southern-California, or Los Angeles premieres. The Fountain also offers a full season of multi-ethnic dance, being the foremost presenters of flamenco in Los Angeles, educational outreach programs, and national/international tours. Fountain Theatre projects have been seen in Los Angeles, New York City, San Francisco, Santa Barbara, Seattle, Chicago, Massachusetts, Florida, New Jersey, Minneapolis, London, and Edinburgh, among other cities and countries.

Flamenco
The Fountain Theatre showcases flamenco every month, and is the foremost producer of flamenco on the West Coast.

The theatre is featured prominently in the 2011 documentary, Kumpanía: Flamenco Los Angeles. Live performances and interviews with flamenco dancers and musicians filmed in the theatre are presented, and co-artistic director Deborah Lawlor is also interviewed in the film.

Awards and honors
Fountain Theatre productions have won more than 220 awards for all areas of production, performance, and design. The Fountain Theatre has received more nominations and won more awards than any other intimate theater in the history of the Ovation Awards.

The Fountain has been honored with a Certificate of Appreciation from the Los Angeles City Council for demonstrating years of artistic excellence and "enhancing the cultural life of Los Angeles". It was the recipient of the 2004 Hollywood Arts Council's "Charlie" Award for Live Theatre and Significant Artistic Contribution to Hollywood. In 2009, the LA Weekly named the Fountain Theatre as "one of the Best Theatre Companies of the Decade". In 2011, Broadway World said, "The Fountain Theatre is by the far the best and the brightest that Los Angeles has to offer." In 2012 the Wall Street Journal declared "The Fountain Theatre is one of this country's best intimate regional houses."

Productions
The Normal Heart (2013) by Larry Kramer
Heart Song (2013) by Stephen Sachs
On the Spectrum (2013) by Ken LaZebnik
In the Red and Brown Water (2012–2013) by Tarell Alvin McCraney
The Blue Iris (2012) by Athol Fugard
Cyrano (2012) by Edmond Rostand, adapted by Stephen Sachs
El Nogalar (2012) by Tanya Saracho
Bakersfield Mist (2011) by Stephen Sachs – an NNPN Rolling World Premiere
A House Not Meant to Stand (2011) by Tennessee Williams 
 The Train Driver (2010–2011) by Athol Fugard 
 Opus (2010) by Michael Hollinger 
 The Ballad of Emmett Till (2010) by Ifa Bayeza
 Shining City (2009) by Conor McPherson
 Coming Home (2009) by Athol Fugard
 The Accomplices (2009) by Bernard Weinraub; remounted at the Odyssey Theatre
 Photograph 51 (2009) by Anna Ziegler
 Gem of the Ocean (2009) by August Wilson
 The Accomplices (2008) by Bernard Weinraub
 And Her Hair Went With Her (2008) by Zina Camblin – an NNPN Rolling World Premiere
 Victory (2008) by Athol Fugard
 The Milk Train Doesn't Stop Here Anymore (2007) by Tennessee Williams
 Taking Flight (2007) by Adriana Sevan
 Sojourn at Ararat (2007) by Gerald Papasian and Nora Armani
 On the Couch with Nora Armani (2007) by Nora Armani
 Miss Julie (2007) by August Strindberg, adapted by Stephen Sachs
 Master Class (2007) by Terrence McNally at Santa Barbara Theatre
 Taxi to Jannah (2006) by Mark Sickman
 The Gimmick (2006) by Dael Orlandersmith
 Little Armenia (2006) by Lory Bedikian, Aram Kouyoumdjian, and Shahe Mankerian
 Joe Turner's Come and Gone (2006) by August Wilson
 What I Heard About Iraq (2005) adapted by Simon Levy
 Acts of Desire (2005) by Yussef El Guindi
 Yellowman (2005) by Dael Orlandersmith
 Exits and Entrances (2005) by Athol Fugard
 Daisy in the Dreamtime (2004) by Lynne Kaufman, at Inside the Ford Amphitheatre
 Master Class (2003–2004) by Terrence McNally
 Going to St. Ives (2003) by Lee Blessing
 After the Fall (2002) by Arthur Miller
 Central Avenue (2001) by Stephen Sachs
 Night of the Iguana (2000–2001) by Tennessee Williams
 The Darker Face of the Earth (2000) by Rita Dove

Selected actors

 Alan Blumenfeld
 Seamus Dever
 Cameron Dye
 Bob Hiltermann
 Adam Huss
 Juanita Jennings
 Karen Kondazian
 Troy Kotsur
 Sandy Martin
 Tracy Middendorf
 Iona Morris
 Jenny O'Hara
 Lisa Pelikan
 Tonya Pinkins
 Larry Poindexter
 Priscilla Pointer
 Maya Lynne Robinson
 Jacqueline Schultz
 Esther Scott
 Malachi Throne
 Nick Ullett
 Karen Malina White

References

External links
 Official website

Theatre in Los Angeles
Theatres completed in 1990
Flamenco
Flamenco groups